Kouchner is a French language surname, cognate to the English language Kushner. Notable people with the name include:
 Bernard Kouchner (1939), French politician and doctor
 Camille Kouchner (1975), French lawyer and law professor, and a daughter of Bernard

References 

French-language surnames
Jewish surnames